The history of the Socialist Workers Party begins with the formation of the Socialist Review Group in 1950, followed by the creation of the International Socialists in 1962 and continues through to the present day with the formation of the Socialist Workers Party in 1977.

Origins
The SWP's origins lie in the Revolutionary Communist Party (RCP), which Tony Cliff joined on his arrival from the territory of Palestine where he had been the central leader of that region's small section of the Fourth International (FI). Given his international reputation, Cliff was co-opted onto the leadership body of the RCP although his impact was small at the time given his limited command of English. Indeed, his idiosyncratic use of the English language was to be a subject of jest by both Cliff and his supporters in later years.

In the RCP, Cliff was a supporter of the majority tendency of that party around Jock Haston and Ted Grant. Therefore, he supported the perspectives of the RCP at the end of the Second World War which placed the small party in opposition to the new leadership of the Fourth International around Ernest Mandel, then known as Germain, and Michel Raptis, better known as Pablo, which was backed by the American Socialist Workers' Party. In this capacity he wrote All That Glitters is not Gold in which he discussed his view that, contrary to the opinion of the International Secretariat of the Fourth International, there was not going to be a major slump.

Cliff also backed Haston when he disputed the growing sympathies of the FI for Josip Broz Tito's Yugoslavia, but by this time Haston was growing demoralised and would soon drop out of revolutionary politics entirely. Cliff however was beginning to develop the idea that the Union of Soviet Socialist Republics was a bureaucratic state capitalist society, prompted in part by earlier arguments pointing in this direction from Haston. Much later Cliff in his autobiography would acknowledge the debt he felt to Haston. There is an irony in this as it has been suggested that Cliff had been briefed by the leadership of the FI, while passing through France, to oppose Haston on just this question, although no proof of this has been made public.

More importantly at the time, Haston's collapse and the hostility of the FI to the RCP meant that the party was forced to join the Labour Party. Once inside the Labour Party, its members were instructed to work under the direction of Gerry Healy in his entrist group The Club. This led to many former members of the RCP leaving politics in reaction to Healy's brutal regime and in turn Healy embarked on a campaign of expulsions against anyone who opposed his authority. One consequence of this was that a number of comrades who supported Cliff's state capitalist position began to act as a faction. Cliff himself was unable to participate in this work having been deported to Dublin from which he was not to return permanently until 1952.

With the Korean War, passions in The Club became more aroused and after a vote on Birmingham Trades Council in which Cliff's supporters, including Percy Downey, voted for a neutral, third camp, position they were expelled en masse from The Club. Cliff himself, being a member of the almost non-existent Irish section of the FI, could not be expelled. The final result of these events was the foundation of the Socialist Review Group organised around the magazine of the same name.

Socialist Review Group (1950–1962)
The Socialist Review Group (SRG) was founded at the end of September 1950 at a conference in Camden Town in London. 33 members were claimed of whom 21 were present on the day. Apart from Tony Cliff, among the more notable members can be listed Bill Ainsworth, Geoff Carlsson, Raymond Challinor, Percy Downey, Duncan Hallas, Peter Morgan, Anil Moonesinghe, Jean Tait and Ken Tarbuck. It was, in essence, a fragment of the RCP of which party all its members had been adherents. It was in the milieu of former members of the RCP that the new SRG saw its audience too.

The new group adopted the magazine Socialist Review as its central organ and it was to run from 1950 to 1962. Asserting their political continuity with Trotskyism they argued that they stood on the ideas of Leon Trotsky and Bolshevik Leninism except insofar as they differed as to their analysis of the states dominated by Stalinist parties. To this end they adopted three documents summarising their viewpoint; The Nature of Stalin's Russia (the first edition of Cliff's State Capitalism in Russia), The Class Nature of the People's Democracies and Marxism and the Theory of Bureaucratic Collectivism. In closing their first conference the group sent greetings to Natalya Sedova Trotsky, the widow of Leon Trotsky, who like them held state capitalist convictions.

In regard to its international connections the new group contacted various dissident currents coming out of the Fourth International (which split in 1953) among whom can be enumerated Raya Dunayevskaya in the USA, Chaulieu in France, Mangano in Italy and Jungclas in Germany. The named individuals and their tendencies came from both the right and left of the Fourth International and unsurprisingly nothing came of these contacts. Of more importance was a loose liaison with the International Socialist League in the USA and the journal of that group, New International, was distributed by the SRG until it ceased publication in 1958. Moreover, Socialist Review would reprint material from its pages, for example from Chinese and Ukrainian revolutionaries, and Cliff would contribute to New International in his turn.

Early editions of Socialist Review closely mirror the concerns of the SRG in its first years as they sought to recruit from former RCPers and in the Labour Party. A great deal of the material in the magazine concerns Stalinism and world politics in general terms. One particular example would be the attempt to provide the Socialist fellowship, a grouping of left wing Labour Party members strongly influenced by Gerry Healy's Club, with an alternative statement of policy. This may be taken as a first general statement of programme by the SRG given its all encompassing nature and, apart from its position on Stalinism, is informed by a conception of transitional politics that is characteristic of Trotskyism. Meanwhile, entrist work in the Birmingham Labour Party led to the expulsion of SRG members from the Labour Party.

The SRG also had its internal controversies of which the first was the expulsion of Ellis Hillman, later a London councillor, who argued that the Stalinist parties were embryonic state capitalist societies. In this he was echoing the positions of the Johnson-Forrest tendency, C. L. R. James and Raya Dunayevskaya, and directly challenging Cliff's analysis of state capitalism. He also argued, in a spectacularly eclectic fashion, for what he called the organic unity of the SRG and Ted Grant's group of fellow ex-RCPers. He was replied to with regard to the Stalinist parties by Duncan Hallas whose article was later reprinted in the collection The Origins of the International Socialists. In the event he was expelled and the group's politics as a Trotskyist tendency differing only in its analysis of Stalinism was confirmed.

Although it began by asserting its fidelity to Trotskyism the SRG would move way from the 'orthodox' Trotskyism which they took from their origins in the RCP. Prior to this development, but setting the scene for it, the group experienced something of a change over of leading figures from 1952 to 1954. Most importantly of all Tony Cliff was permitted to return to London from his exile in Dublin and for the first time was able to function as an active leader of the group rather than through others or during visits to his family. Cliff's centrality to the group cannot be overemphasized in these years as his wife, Chanie Rosenberg, was also an active member and in September 1952 Michael Kidron, Cliff's brother-in-law, travelled to Britain from Israel. Kidron would later recruit Seymour Papert, later to become an important pioneer in the field of computers, who would also play a considerable role in the SRG. Others joining at this time were Stan Newens, later a Labour MP, and Bernard Dix, later prominent in the National Union of Public Employees (NUPE). Significantly, as the group was renewed by such new recruits it lost some of its earlier character as figures like Bill Ainsworth, Ken Tarbuck, later to pass through a number of left groups, and Duncan Hallas left, while Anil Moonesinghe and his wife Jeanne Hoban left for Ceylon where the former would eventually become a Minister. Duncan Hallas alone would return 14 years later and again play a leading role in what was by then the International Socialists.

International Socialists (1962–1977)
In 1962 the Socialist Review Group became the International Socialists (IS) taking the name of their new journal International Socialism. The journal had briefly appeared in 1958 as a cyclostyled magazine and a second issue, publishing Cliff's essay on Rosa Luxemburg had appeared in 1959, but began regular publication in 1960. The group also began publishing a paper called Industrial Worker in 1961 which was renamed Labour Worker in 1962. This was replaced by Socialist Worker, launched in 1968, with Roger Protz being the first editor.

However, for much of the 1960s the most important group publication was Young Guard. Working within the Young Socialists the IS had issued a youth magazine called Rebel from 1960 onwards as the YS was, along with similarly youth oriented Campaign for Nuclear Disarmament, the greatest source of recruits to IS. Within the highly factionalised atmosphere of the YS, however, Rebel soon disappeared as the IS forged an alliance with the supporters of Ted Grant around the Rally paper. The two tendencies jointly launched Young Guard as their challenge to both Transport House and the Keep Left grouping of Gerry Healy's supporters. The editorial content and most contributors to Young Guard were firmly in support of IS, with Grant's supporters playing a minor role. After Healy's followers in the Socialist Labour League left what was renamed the Labour Party Young Socialists, IS was briefly able to take the leadership of that organisation. But by this point much of the life had gone out of the youth movement and Young Guard ceased publication in 1965, being superseded by a new run of Rebel which lasted in its turn until 1967. By this time though, IS as a whole was drifting away from entrist work within the Labour Party as the industrial struggle developed.

In 1968, the IS put out an appeal for revolutionary unity, aiming the appeal at the industrial militants aligned with the Communist Party, although it was also directed at the newly formed International Marxist Group (IMG) and the libertarian Solidarity group. In the event only the small Workers' Fight group responded favourably and as soon as they became members of the IS they constituted themselves as the Trotskyist Tendency (TT) faction. The TT was expelled from IS after it attempted to galvanise opposition to the group's leadership on political issues including Ireland and the European Union and on the question of internal democracy. At the conference at which what the leadership called "defusion" took place, 40% of the delegates voted against. Now substantially larger than when it had entered IS, the TT reconstituted itself as Workers' Fight, and still exists today in the form of the Alliance for Workers' Liberty.

Despite such internal controversies the IS grew in the early 1970s gaining a foothold in industry and forming several rank and file groups in the unions. However internal debate did not cease with the departure of the TT and in 1973 there were several expulsions of smaller groups, including those of the Right Opposition, part of which became the Revolutionary Communist Group.

In 1974 the Left Faction, one of whose leaders was Dave Stocking, was also expelled and formed Workers Power. It had argued that the IS should write a transitional programme which would form the basis for demands made by the group and allow the membership to keep the leadership to account, preventing 'turns' by voting on exact positions in this document. They also argued that the SWP had become opportunist on the Irish Question after it had stopped giving the Provisional Irish Republican Army (IRA) unconditional but critical support because the IRA's strategy had changed and had turned public opinion solidly against it – the Left Faction argued unconditional but critical support was still needed.

During the 1960s the rise of unofficial strike action led the International Socialists to place emphasis on the building of a rank and file movement within the trade unions in order to combat the bureaucratic leaders of those organisations. This led to the development of a series of rank and file papers including The Collier (Mining), Redder Tape (Civil Service), Rank and File Teacher, etc. These were briefly brought together in a National Rank and File Organising Committee in 1974, the peak of IS influence in the workers' movement.

Another aspect of this work was that a number of historians in the IS devoted themselves to rediscovering the past of rank and file movements in the labour movement. A series of articles by Jim Higgins on this topic was published in the group's journal International Socialism. Other related work appeared in book or pamphlet form including books on the Communist Party related Minority Movement of the 1920s and the industrial politics of the CPGB in that period. Work was also done on the pre-World War I period with Raymond Challinor's book on the Socialist Labour Party entitled The Origins of British Bolshevism.

In the mid-1970s Cliff argued that the older workers' leaders, including shop stewards, were corrupted by reformism and therefore IS had to turn to untried young workers – the more cynically minded claimed Cliff wanted the party to turn to them as being more gullible to Cliff's more idiosyncratic flights of fancy. This was part of the reason for the attempt made at this time to popularise Socialist Worker. This turn was unanimously rejected months later, but by then Jim Higgins was removed as National Secretary and Roger Protz from his position as editor of Socialist Worker for opposing these changes. Prompted by Duncan Hallas, they formed an International Socialist Opposition. Ultimately, a large section of the leadership, in particular Jim Higgins, Roger Protz and John Palmer, were expelled or left in solidarity with those expelled in 1975 and formed the Workers League. It has been estimated that no more than 150 members of IS – some having been expelled – joined the Workers' League but that several hundred more left as a result of the factional struggle.

The factional dispute consumed a great deal of the energies of IS through the course of 1976 but, nonetheless, a great deal of work was still accomplished especially with the launch by the Rank and File Co-ordinating Committee of the Right to Work Campaign which sought to address the then growing problem of mass unemployment. This attempt to bring the problem of mass unemployment culminated in a 'Jarrow syle' Right to Work March from Liverpool through England to London, where it was broken up by violent attacks from the infamous, and later disbanded, Special Patrol Group. Another notable change was the move of IS towards electoral participation for the first time under its own banner – in earlier days some members had come near to being adopted as Prospective Parliamentary Candidates by the Labour Party and at least two members had served terms as councillors – although whilst initial results were encouraging the tactic was later abandoned due to poor results. The intention had been for the IS, renamed in 1977 the Socialist Workers' Party, to stand a slate of at least 50 candidates in the then upcoming General Election. This ambitious goal was now abandoned.

Socialist Workers Party (1977 onwards) 

At the beginning of 1977 the Socialist Workers' Party was launched as the IS renamed itself in expectation of a wave of working class struggles against the Labour Government of the day. Immediately this move was rejected by Peter Sedgwick, a long time and much respected member who resigned in protest. Expecting an increase in struggle but with industrial unrest stalled the new SWP used its leadership of the National Rank and File Organising Committee to launch the Right to Work Campaign in protest at the rising level of unemployment. The RTWC was to lead large scale marches, first to the Trades Union Congress annual conference urging it to campaign on the issue, later in protest to the Conservative Party conference, from 1976 to 1981. In the localities however the RTWC had no ongoing existence other than as a front organisation for local SWP branches. In the meantime the parent National Rank and File Organising Committee disappeared.

During these years at times heated debates took place in branch meetings and in the pages of the, then regular, Internal Bulletin concerning a number of questions. For example, during this period a debate emerged as to the group's understanding of the question of women's oppression in capitalist society and whether or not feminism was to be seen in a positive light. This debate centred on the role to be played by the group's publication Woman's Voice. Eventually the conclusion was reached that feminism, as an ideology, could not liberate women from their situation as a social group oppressed by and in class society. By the time this position had been reached, however, opponents of the majority view had left the group and the magazine was discontinued as its sought-for audience had disappeared.

Running alongside the debate on the future of Woman's Voice there was a discussion concerning SWP work among, and the attitude of the group toward, blacks and Asians. From the early 1960s the IS had made clear its opposition to any immigration controls, work in which Paul Foot had played a prominent role. Another attempt to reach Asian workers had been initiated by Nigel Harris but had faded quite rapidly. There was then a considerable debate within the SWP around the role of the newly launched Flame – Black Workers' Paper For Self Defence when it appeared in the late 1970s. Edited by Anthony Bogues  the paper appeared for a few years before it, in its turn, faded away, having failed to win mass backing and lacking the support of the SWP, which had been withdrawn when the internal debate within SWP ranks came to the conclusion that any paper aimed at black people should be subject to direct SWP control. This clashed with the views of individuals such as Bogues, who had returned to Jamaica to become a lecturer, who envisaged Flame as an autonomous grouping only loosely linked to the SWP.

Similarly a debate took place in these years concerning the question of the devolution of power to Scotland and Wales. In this instance the result was that the leadership would eventually change the entirely negative opposition of the group to devolution. At one point in this debate a Republican faction was formed with the support of a considerable part of the membership but with the change of line most supporters of the faction were easily placated. A few however, including Steve Freeman and Allan Armstrong, were to generalise their criticisms of the SWP and drifted out of it in 1980/81. Around the same time Steve Jeffries, an industrial organiser for the group and long time leading member, also left in disillusionment. In part his resignation was connected to the final disbandment of the remaining rank and file groups.

In many respects the period 1976 to 1981 can best be seen as a transitional period from the IS to the SWP. Not only was the rank and file strategy abandoned in practice, if not in theory, but there was in this period a massive change in leading figures within the group. By the end of this transition not only had figures associated with the ISO left but so to had a layer of intellectuals such as Steven Marks, Richard Kuper, Martin Shaw and Peter Sedgwick; industrial organisers such as Steve Jeffreys, Arthur Affleck and Bill Message had also left; in addition to which almost the entire toe-hold in blue collar industry won so laboriously had left or been expelled. And all this before the large scale restructuring of British capitalism.

The Anti Nazi League
In the 1970s the IS took part in a number of initiatives against the small fascist groups of the time but by 1974 these groups had coalesced into the National Front (NF) and were gaining substantial votes in electoral contests. To a lesser degree the British Movement was also providing cause for alarm. However it was not until the NF attempted to march through Lewisham in 1977 to the massive response of the local community leading to physical confrontations that the IS, by now transformed into the SWP took the initiative nationally. The result was the launch of the Anti Nazi League (ANL) which was conceived of as a United Front body which would involve forces, primarily within the workers' movement, politically to the right of the SWP.

To a considerable degree the ANL did win support from forces beyond the ranks of the SWP including from Ernie Roberts MP, a long-standing pillar of the Labour Left, from Peter Hain, then best known as an Anti-Apartheid campaigner, from Neil Kinnock MP and from numerous groups and organisations within the workers' movement. Perhaps the most significant body to endorse the ANL was the then substantial Indian Workers Association. In the next few years the ANL would call countless demonstrations against the NF and BM. The policy of the ANL was physical confrontation of far right groups in an effort to "No Platform" them—that is, to deny them any public platform.

This policy however brought the disapproval of the media and the ANL suffered a blow in March 1979 amid claims of financial 'irregularities' (i.e., funds being diverted to the SWP) which claims were denied by the National Treasurer of the ANL, Labour Party member Ernie Roberts. However some celebrity members of the ANL – Nottingham Forest manager Brian Clough being the first – renounced their support at this time.

Despite the success of the 'Rock Against Racism' concerts (an ANL affiliated campaign), some of the punk rock bands that had been outspoken opponents of the NF from the start—such as the Sex Pistols/PiL —refused outright to have anything to do with an organisation they perceived as little more than an SWP front. (The Clash did headline the 1978 Carnival however). Tony Cliff told a Guardian reporter during the March 1979 crisis, "The leadership of the ANL is the SWP and we don't give a damn".

In 1981 the ANL was formally wound up as it was felt to be no longer needed and was then dissolved. Some individuals who had been involved in the ANL disagreed with this, and also wanted to show solidarity with the more militant side of the republican movement in Northern Ireland grouping around Provisional Sinn Féin. Expelled, they were to form Red Action.

The 1980s

By 1981 after a series of internal discussions the SWP was united around an understanding that the period was one that was best characterised as being a downturn in class combativity and that this meant that the SWP should concentrate its work on basic propaganda tasks and educational development of its membership. This understanding was balanced in the early  part of the decade by adding a caveat that while the period was generally one of downturn there was also a political upturn around the Labour Left and the resurgent Campaign for Nuclear Disarmament.

This understanding could also lead to the group isolating itself when struggles did break as with the Miners' Strike in the middle of the decade. At that time Miners Support Groups developed in all of Britain's major cities but the SWP chose in the first months of the strike not to join them, on the basis that they were inadequate to deliver the solidarity actions, such as mass picketing and solidarity strike action, which the SWP argued were the tactics needed for the Miners Strike to be concluded victoriously. Later this stance was reversed. Although the SWP continued to argue that the Miners' Strike could only be won if other sections of workers were able to provide solidarity actions, as was the case in a number of major disputes in the 1970s, its members continued to be active around the dispute which was considered doomed to failure without solidarity actions. The hit squads which appeared late in the strike were seen as symptomatic of the desperation and isolation of the more committed younger miners and were firmly disapproved of.

In the aftermath the leadership of the SWP initiated moves towards the Militant tendency to form a common organisation motivated by the Labour Party's expulsion of that group's supporters. However, there was no response to the SWP's overtures and the Militant tendency, later Militant Labour, was the object of several Open Letters in Socialist Worker during the 1990s but to no avail.

21st century

Since then, the SWP has affiliated with groups in various countries which comprise the International Socialist Tendency, and has been involved in a wide range of organisations, including the re-launch of the Anti Nazi League (which has evolved into Unite Against Fascism), and Globalise Resistance. They were instrumental in setting up the Stop the War Coalition an anti-war alliance formed first to oppose the invasion of Afghanistan and then the invasion of Iraq. They considered this anti-war movement to the major radicalising force in early 21st Century British politics and believe that it is a continuation of the anti-capitalist movement.

In 2001, the international tendency expelled the US section, the International Socialist Organization, despite no serious political differences.

In 1999 the SWP joined in the Socialist Alliance but later argued that it never managed to engage in the radicalism of the anti-war movement and presided over its winding up in 2004. They transferred their energies to a new project RESPECT Unity Coalition believing its emergence from the anti-war movement gave it the opportunity to be a much larger movement and cease sectarianism.

In Scotland SWP members joined the Scottish Socialist Party as an officially recognised platform in 2001 known as the Socialist Worker Platform. However membership of the SSP does not seem to have increased the influence of the SWP and it has been claimed that the group has declined in numbers since joining. This claim being made by a former member of the SWP, Gregor Gall, in an article published in an attempt to change the course of the group written in 2004. Gall's figures were highly suspect and his motion did not even attract a single vote from the Scottish Platform of the SWP, Gall has since left the SWP and is now seen as a supporter of the leadership of the SSP.  In 2006, SWP members in Scotland left the Scottish Socialist Party and joined the new organisation, Solidarity (Scotland).

Another major change for the SWP was the selling of its print shop in 2004 as the enterprise was no longer able to win an adequate degree of commercial work to supplement the group's own printing requirements; it had printed Private Eye, the Morning Star, and other publications. Built in the early 1970s the print shop had originally been established in 1968 when Socialist Worker first appeared. SWP publications are now printed by commercial printers with the result that their appearance has undergone a great improvement. However it should not be ignored that the print shop had helped to subsidise the SWP's own publications and it has been suggested that the sale of the print shop was the result of a crisis in the group's finances.

In the late 1990s, the membership was claimed to be around 5,000 with 4,000 paying Dues monthly. The 2004 Party Conference reported a membership figure of 7,585 members, although other rival socialist groups estimate it to now be closer to 3,000.  There is debate within the party as to the reason for failure to grow out of the radicalism of the anti-war movement, some claiming it is the lack of left/right perspectives, some the low industrial struggle, others claim the unconditional but critical support for "insurgents" isolates them.

There was a disagreement within the leadership of the SWP concerning the future of the party's involvement in broader fronts such as the Stop the War Coalition. As a result, its leading body, the Central Committee, proposed a slate that removed John Rees from the body over the objections of Rees and Lindsey German in 2009. This slate was approved by the party conference.

Internal crisis in 2013–14 over allegations of rape

A Disputes Committee document was discussed at the party conference in January 2013 about allegations of sexual assault and rape made by a 19-year-old female member against former SWP National Secretary Martin Smith, known as Comrade Delta. Allegations about Smith's behaviour had been an issue for several years within the group, the first complaint against him being made in 2010. Delta has never been questioned by the police about the allegations made against him. According to Alex Callinicos in June 2014, around 700 members of the SWP have resigned from the group because of concerns about the way the allegations were mishandled, in their view.

References

The Smallest Mass Party In The World by Ian Birchall: a history of the SWP and its predecessors to 1981, written by a prominent SWP member.
Cliff, T. A World to Win, Bookmarks Publications, London, 2000.  Tony Cliff's autobiography.
Origins of the International Socialists Duncan Hallas
More Years for the Locust: The Origins of the SWP, Critique of Cliff and the SWP by Jim Higgins, former National Secretary of the International Socialists.

Socialist Workers Party (UK)
Trotskyism in the United Kingdom
Socialist Workers Party (Britain)
Socialist Workers Party
Socialist Workers Party